Aarne Kauppinen (4 July 1889, Rantasalmi – 7 July 1927) was a Finnish artisan, smallholder and politician. He served as a Member of the Parliament of Finland from 1919 to 1922, representing the Social Democratic Party of Finland (SDP).

References

1889 births
1927 deaths
People from Rantasalmi
People from Mikkeli Province (Grand Duchy of Finland)
Social Democratic Party of Finland politicians
Members of the Parliament of Finland (1919–22)